Tjipke Visser (12 December 1876 – 22 January 1955) was a Dutch sculptor. His work was part of the sculpture event in the art competition at the 1936 Summer Olympics. Visser's work was included in the 1939 exhibition and sale Onze Kunst van Heden (Our Art of Today) at the Rijksmuseum in Amsterdam.

References

1876 births
1955 deaths
20th-century Dutch sculptors
Dutch male sculptors
Olympic competitors in art competitions
People from Friesland
20th-century Dutch male artists